Edward Frederick Spurney   (January 9, 1872 - October 11, 1932), was a Major League Baseball shortstop. He played in three games for the 1891 Pittsburgh Pirates of the National League.

He married Anna A. Suchy, and they had one son, Howard. He died in Cleveland, Ohio, on August 11, 1932, and was buried at Woodland Cemetery in the city.

External links

1872 births
1932 deaths
Major League Baseball shortstops
Baseball players from Ohio
Pittsburgh Pirates players
19th-century baseball players
Ottumwa Coal Palaces players
Evansville Hoosiers players
Burials at Woodland Cemetery (Cleveland)